Oxyothespis dumonti, common name North African grass mantis, is a species of praying mantis in the family Toxoderidae. It is found in Africa.

See also
African mantis
Grass mantis
List of mantis genera and species

References

dumonti
Mantodea of Africa
Insects described in 1941
Endemic fauna of Tunisia